El Naranjo Airport  is a rural airstrip near El Naranjo, a settlement in the diffuse agricultural community between Masagua, Obero, and Torremolinos in Escuintla Department, Guatemala.

See also
 
 
 Transport in Guatemala
 List of airports in Guatemala

References

External links
 OpenStreetMap - El Naranjo Airport
 OurAirports - El Naranjo Airpport
 

Airports in Guatemala
Escuintla Department